Maillas (Occitan: Malhàs) is a hamlet and commune in the Landes department in Nouvelle-Aquitaine in south-western France. It is situated on the Route nationale 524 (N524).

The N524 forms part of the Itinéraire à Grand Gabarit, a route which has been modified to allow its use by the oversize road convoys conveying body sections and wings of the Airbus A380 airliner. Updates to the road layout were necessary to facilitate the transit of the convoys through the commune, including adjustments to the vertical profile of the road.

Politics 
Since 2014, Maillas' mayor has been Jean-Luc Darroman, a former forest contractor of the Divers gauche. Prior to that, from 2001 to his retirement in 2014, the mayor was Christian Garbaye.

See also
Communes of the Landes department

References

Communes of Landes (department)